C & M Community School District was a school district headquartered in Massena, Iowa. The name was a reference to Cumberland and Massena, the two cities it served. It was almost entirely in Cass County with a small portion in Adams County.

Circa 2002 it began a "grade sharing" arrangement with the Anita Community School District, in which the districts sent each other's students to their schools. The Anita district operated the high school while the C&M district operated the middle school; both districts had their own elementary schools. The C&M district had about 201 students in the 2008–2009 school year.

On July 1, 2011, it merged with the Anita district to form the CAM Community School District.

References

External links

 

Defunct school districts in Iowa
School districts disestablished in 2011
2011 disestablishments in Iowa
Education in Cass County, Iowa
Education in Adams County, Iowa